Frederica Planta or Friderica Planta (10 November 1750 – 2 February 1778) was governess and English teacher for the children of George III and Queen Charlotte of Great Britain. She was the daughter of pastor Andreas Planta, assistant librarian at the British Museum, and the sister of librarian Joseph Planta. After her unexpected early death, she was succeeded as teacher of the royal children by her sister , called Peggy.

Early life and family 
Planta was born on 10 November 1750, while her father Andreas Planta (1717–1773), originally a Swiss reformed pastor, worked at the Ansbach court of Charles William Frederick, Margrave of Brandenburg-Ansbach and likely also taught mathematics at the Gymnasium Carolinum.  Her mother was Margarete Scartazzini de Bolgiani from Bondo. Planta's first name Frederica, atypical for her mother's Val Bregaglia region of origin and more typical of Brandenburg, may have been chosen in honour of her father's employer and family.  She had several sisters and one brother, Joseph Planta (1744–1827), later principal librarian of the British Museum. In 1752, her father moved to London to become pastor of the German Reformed congregation at the Savoy Chapel in London where he became assistant librarian at the British Museum in 1758. After 1761, he taught Italian to Queen Charlotte.

Work at court 

In July 1771, Planta was engaged as governess at the court of George III and Queen Charlotte, under the main governess Lady Charlotte Finch. The royal family had first tried to hire her older sister Elizabeth Planta, but she had declined as she preferred to continue to work for Mary Eleanor Bowes. Previously, Frederica had been working as a governess for Lady Hoskyns and was only released from that employment after the Queen's personal intervention, despite her previous employer's protest. Planta, who knew seven languages including Latin and Greek, was supposed to teach the children first English, then other languages, as well as reading, writing and the foundations of all subjects. She was described as "a most pious Christian" and lived close to the Royal Family at Kew Palace. Queen Charlotte was interested in theory and practice of education, and was an early supporter of education delivered through play. Planta delivered this, "gain[ing] their affection by making their learning much play as possible", as she wrote in a letter. For education in history of England, she had designed cards that her charges should put in the correct order, and she considered this as a successful teaching tool, to be used together with stories. Planta's salary was £100 a year
($ in ); from 1773, she received an additional £50 ($ in ) for food, tea, chocolate, coffee and sugar. Her sister Elizabeth considered Frederica's working conditions and salary to be "quite mediocre".

Death  
Planta died on 2 February 1778, of an "accidental illness". Like her father, she was buried at St George's, Bloomsbury. Her sister  (known as "Peggy") succeeded her sister as governess and English teacher at court.

Footnotes

Sources 

1750 births
1778 deaths
Governesses to the British Royal Household
18th-century Swiss educators
Swiss emigrants to the United Kingdom
18th-century British educators
18th-century British women
18th-century Swiss women
Planta family